The Virgin Man is a 1956 Argentine comedy film directed by Román Viñoly Barreto and starring Luis Sandrini.

Cast
 Luis Sandrini 
 Eduardo Sandrini 	
 Aída Luz 	
 Julie Bardot		
 Antonia Herrero 		
 Bertha Moss

External links
 

1956 films
1950s Spanish-language films
Argentine black-and-white films
Films directed by Román Viñoly Barreto
Argentine comedy films
1956 comedy films
1950s Argentine films